Valley View Acres is a neighborhood located within the city of Sacramento, California. The neighborhood is located south of East Levee Road, north of Sotnip Road/Del Paso Road, west of Steelhead Creek and UEDA Parkway, and east of Sorento Road. 

Neighborhoods in Sacramento, California